Jared C. Hagert is an American politician serving as a member of the North Dakota House of Representatives from the 20th district. Elected in November 2018, he assumed office on December 1, 2020.

Education 
Hagert earned a Bachelor of Science degree in agricultural systems management from North Dakota State University in 1998.

Career 
Hagert owned and operated Hagert Farms and is the president of Integrated Ag Services, LLC. He was also the president of the United Soybean Board. Hagert was elected to the North Dakota House of Representatives in November 2018 and assumed office on December 1, 2018.

References 

Living people
North Dakota State University alumni
Republican Party members of the North Dakota House of Representatives
Year of birth missing (living people)